The Nine Saints were a group of missionaries who were important in the initial growth of Christianity in what is now Ethiopia during the late 5th century. Their names were Abba Aftse, Abba Alef, Abba Aragawi, Abba Garima (Isaac, or Yeshaq), Abba Guba, Abba Liqanos, Abba Pantelewon, Abba Tsahma, and Abba Yem’ata. Although frequently described as coming from Syria, only two or three actually came from that province; according to Paul B. Henze, others have been traced to Constantinople, Anatolia, and even Rome.

The Ethiopian historian Taddesse Tamrat speculates that they may have been connected with the anti-Monophysite and anti-Miaphysite persecutions that followed the Council of Chalcedon, which adopted Dyophysitism. Their activities spread Christianity beyond "a narrow corridor between Adulis and Aksum along the caravan routes." Besides converting the local inhabitants to Christianity, they also founded a number of monastic houses that followed the rule of Saint Pachomius: Abba Aftse founded the monastery at Yeha; Abba Alef the northernmost establishment at Bi'isa on the south bank of the Mareb River; the foundation of the important monastery of Debre Damo is attributed to Abba Aragawi; Abbas Liqanos and Pantelewon are credited with establishing Pentalewon Monastery in Axum; Abba Garima founded Abba Garima Monastery north of Adwa; Abba Guba the one at Madara; Abba Tsahma one at Sedenya; and Abba Yem’ata founded the southernmost one of the group in the Gar'alta, noted for its Abuna Yemata Guh church named after him.

Abba Garima and the Garima Gospels
Recent radiocarbon dating supports the tradition of Saint Abba Garima's arrival at the Abba Garima Monastery in 494.  The Garima Gospels, which Garima is said to have written, is now regarded as "the world's earliest illustrated Christian manuscript" and the oldest surviving Ethiopian manuscript of any kind.

See also 
 Thirteen Assyrian Fathers

References

External links
Life of Abba Pantelewon from The Dictionary of Ethiopian Biography

9 Nine Saints
Ethiopian saints
History of Ethiopia
Syrian Christian saints
5th-century Christian saints
5th-century Christian monks
Christian missionaries in Ethiopia